Harry Bradley may refer to:

 Harry Bentley Bradley (born 1939), American car designer
 Harry C. Bradley (painter), American pin-up painter
 Harry C. Bradley (actor) (1869–1947), American actor
 Harry Lynde Bradley (1885–1965), co-founder of the Lynde & Harry Bradley Foundation
 Harry Oliver Bradley (1929–1990), Canadian teacher and politician
 Harry Bradley (musician) (born 1974), Irish flute player

See also

 Lynde & Harry Bradley Foundation
 Lynde & Harry Bradley Technology and Trade School, Milwaukee, Wisconsin, United States
 Henry Bradley (disambiguation)
 Harold Bradley (disambiguation)